is a form of wagashi (traditional Japanese sweet).

Because gyūhi is more delicate, it is usually less frequently made and served than mochi. It is sometimes featured in sweets that originated in the Kyoto area. Tinted gyūhi is the base of matsunoyuki, a wagashi that resembles a pine tree dusted with snow.

Nerikiri is often tinted and molded in ways similar to the treatment of marzipan in Western desserts.

Hyōroku mochi
This is made of gyūhi.

Wagashi